Radmožanci ( or) is a settlement northwest of Lendava in the Prekmurje region of Slovenia.

References

External links
Radmožanci on Geopedia

Populated places in the Municipality of Lendava